The Alberta Securities Commission (ASC) is a regulatory agency which administers and enforces securities legislation in the Canadian province of Alberta.

The Alberta Securities Act RSA 2000, a revision of the original Act that came into effect on January 1, 2002, is the statute that establishes Alberta's securities laws and gives the Alberta Securities Commission its powers and duties.  

The ASC also oversees the ICE NGX Canada Inc., the Investment Industry Regulatory Organization of Canada, and the Mutual Fund Dealers Association of Canada. Along with British Columbia, the ASC jointly oversees the operations of the TSX Venture Exchange.

The organization of the ASC is divided into Members and Staff, which includes the Executive Management. Members set policy and recommend changes to the Securities Act and the Securities Regulation, and members act as the commission's Board of Directors. The Staff has responsibility for registering persons and companies, reviewing prospectuses, considering exemption applications and taking enforcement action.

The ASC staff has also created seven advisory committees to act as sounding boards for developing new or amended securities regulation: Exempt Market Dealer Advisory Committee, Derivatives Advisory Committee, Financial Advisory Committee, Market Advisory Committee, Petroleum Advisory Committee, Securities Advisory Committee, and New Economy Advisory Committee.

See also
 Canadian securities regulation
 Securities Commission
 Canadian Securities Administrators
 British Columbia Securities Commission
 Ontario Securities Commission
 Autorité des marchés financiers (Québec)

References

External links
Official site
CheckFirst Investor Education
Sample Ruling

Alberta law
Financial regulatory authorities of Canada
Alberta government departments and agencies